Grochowa may refer to the following places in Poland:
Grochowa, Trzebnica County in Lower Silesian Voivodeship (south-west Poland)
Grochowa, Ząbkowice Śląskie County in Lower Silesian Voivodeship (south-west Poland)
Grochowa, Masovian Voivodeship (east-central Poland)